The Arcturidae are a family of marine isopod crustaceans in the suborder Valvifera. Members of the family resemble woodlice and are found globally in cooler areas in shallow seas.

Description
The head is incapable of rotating laterally. Two pairs of antennae are set at the front of the head. The eyes are usually well developed and the mouthparts do not form a suctorial cone or proboscis. The thorax or pereon is smooth or slightly sculptured and sometimes spinose or rugose. A flexion occurs between it and the abdomen or pleon, so from a lateral view, the front part of the animal is arched up. The pereiopods are held close to the head, while the pleopods are attached to the pleon, making it appear no appendages on the pereon.

Genera
The World Register of Marine Species includes these genera in the family:

Agularcturus Kensley, 1984
Amesopous Stebbing, 1905
Arctopsis Barnard, 1920
Arcturina Koehler, 1911
Arcturinella Poisson & Maury, 1931
Arcturinoides Kensley, 1977
Arcturopsis Koehler, 1911
Arcturus Latreille, 1829
Astacilla Cordiner, 1793
Edwinjoycea Menzies & Kruczynski, 1983
Idarcturus Barnard, 1914
Neastacilla Tattersall, 1921
Parastacilla Hale, 1924
Spectarcturus Schultz, 1981

References

Valvifera
Crustacean families